The Philippine General Hospital (also known as University of the Philippines–Philippine General Hospital or UP–Philippine General Hospital), simply referred to as UP–PGH or PGH, is a tertiary state-owned hospital administered and operated by the University of the Philippines Manila. It is designated as the National University Hospital, and the national government referral center. It stands within a  site located at the UP Manila Campus in Ermita, Manila. PGH has 1,100 beds and 400 private beds, and has an estimated of 4,000 employees to serve more than 600,000 patients every year.

The PGH, being the largest training hospital in the country, is the laboratory hospital of health science students enrolled in the University of the Philippines. This includes students of medicine, nursing, physical therapy, pharmacy, occupational therapy, dentistry, and speech pathology.

There are 16 clinical departments under the Philippine General Hospital — Family and Community Medicine, Anesthesiology, Internal Medicine, Surgery, Neurosciences, Pediatrics, Otorhinolaryngology-Head & Neck Surgery, Ophthalmology, Orthopedics, Rehabilitation Medicine, Psychiatry, Radiology, Pathology, Emergency Medicine, Obstetrics & Gynecology, and Dermatology—all of which offer residency and fellowship training. It also offers various training for paramedical specialties such as nursing, physical therapy, occupational therapy, speech pathology, radiation technology, nutrition, hospital dentistry, medical technology and EMT training.

History 
In 1907, The Philippine Commission passed Act No. 1688 which appropriated the sum of about ₱780,000.00 for the construction of the Philippine General Hospital in Manila. The cornerstone of the hospital was laid on February 28, 1908. The bids for the construction of the buildings were opened on July 27 and the contract was awarded to the lowest bidder, H. Thurber of the Manila Construction Company. The structural works for the central administration building, a surgical pavilion with two operating rooms, a building for dispensary and out-clinic, five ward pavilions of sixty beds each, a nurses’ home, a kitchen, an ambulance stable and morgue were completed on November 30, 1909. In 1910, the Philippine General Hospital opened its door to the public on September 1 with three hundred thirty beds and was eventually linked to the Philippine Medical School. PGH remained open during World War II, where its wards overflowed with victims of the conflict. It treated Filipino, Japanese soldiers and American internees alike, even if the hospital supplies are almost depleted.

In 1981, Architect J. Ramos undertook the master planning of the PGH renovation project. PGH celebrated its centennial in 2007, one hundred years since the US government passed a law establishing it.

During the COVID-19 pandemic in the Philippines, PGH was selected as one of the COVID-19 referral centers in the country. The hospital provided 130 beds for COVID-19 patients, while continuing to serve other people with other ailments. PGH officially accepted COVID-19 referrals from other hospitals starting March 30, 2020.

Architecture 

The Philippine General Hospital Administration Building is situated along Taft Avenue in Manila. It was built by architect Tomas Mapua in neo-classic style that follows the Daniel Burnham plan for Manila. This plan included Manila Hotel, Army and Navy Club and the Philippine General Hospital. These were executed by his successor, Parsons included who was a city planner in the Philippines during the early period American colonization in the country.  His works were a clear translation of Neoclassicism into a new hybrid of colonial tropical architecture.

In 2014, the Pediatric Oncology Isolation Ward was constructed by Sta. Elena Construction and Development through the generosity of its president and CEO, Alice Eduardo. The ward was dedicated to children with cancer, particularly from poor households that could not afford the costs of an isolation ward. A dormitory was also built to house the children's caregivers or relatives while they were admitted to PGH.

In 2020, Alice Eduardo contributed to the restoration and modernization of Bahay Silungan. This is a heritage building that served as the Nurses' Home, which was first occupied in 1911. The home has 18 bedrooms, terraces, and verandas. The restoration was decided amid the COVID-19 pandemic so that the doctors, nurses, and transient patients would have a temporary home. Today, Bahay Silungan accommodates up to 66 nurses and 14 transient patients.

References

External links
 Philippine General Hospital Foundation
 Sentro Oftalmologico Jose Rizal (PGH Department of Ophthalmology and Visual Sciences)
 UP-PGH Department of Anesthesiology

Hospital buildings completed in 1909
Hospitals in Manila
Hospitals established in 1907
Buildings and structures in Ermita
1907 establishments in the Philippines
Cultural Properties of the Philippines in Metro Manila
20th-century architecture in the Philippines